Boones Creek is a neighborhood of Johnson City, in northern Washington County, Tennessee. Almost all of Boones Creek has been annexed by Johnson City, and has become a neighborhood of Johnson City. However, much of it has the postal addresses of "Gray, Tennessee". It extends along Boone's Creek and other nearby tributaries of Boone Lake, from the strip of restaurants, hotels and other businesses around the intersection of Boone's Creek Road (State Route 354) and Interstate 26, northeastwards to the older business district at the intersection of 354 and State Route 36, and up to Boone Lake, formerly the Watauga River.

History
This community, the first permanent European settlement in Tennessee, was named for the creek that runs through it, which is named for pioneer Daniel Boone.

In the center of Boones Creek is a historic marker that tells the origins of the community's name.  Daniel Boone was a frontiersman, and hunted over large areas of the early frontier lands.  On one of these hunting trips, he was chased by the local Indians.  He hid underneath a waterfall on Boones Creek, now called Boone Falls, from Indians to avoid their displeasure at him hunting on their lands. There was also a historic tree nearby.  A beech tree once stood with the inscription "D Boon cilled a bar on tree in the year 1760". This tree was featured in the film "Sergeant York" when Alvin York (WWI hero) was trying to earn money by hunting and selling pelts. A large piece of the tree is now in the Boones Creek Historical Trust Museum and Opry.

William Bean, the first white settler in Tennessee, built a cabin and planted corn on Boone's Creek in 1768 to stake a claim to the land, and moved his family there in 1769.

The historic "downtown" of this historically rural community is now called "Flourville," though still considered part of the Boones Creek community. The "Bean Fort-Spring," a two-story log fort that had water from a spring piped into it, was built there around 1775 and is still standing. So are the early-1800s Hale's Store, the area's first store and post office, and an early-1800s mill, the Flourville Mill. Many homes from the late 1700s and early 1800s are nearby.

A post office called Boons Creek was established in 1841, and remained in operation until it was discontinued in 1900.

Education
These schools in Boones Creek are operated by Washington County Public Schools, City of Johnson City Schools are currently trying to take control of them.
Boones Creek Elementary
Boones Creek Middle (formerly Boones Creek High School)

These schools are operated by the City of Johnson City Schools:
Indian Trail Intermediate
Lake Ridge Elementary

High School Students attend either Daniel Boone High School in Gray operated by Washington County or Science Hill High School in Johnson City operated by Johnson City Schools

Retail
There are several restaurants, hotels/motels and gas stations off the Boones Creek Road/Tennessee State Route 354 Exit off Interstate 26. Several Grocery stores/Supermarkets are also located in Boones Creek and they are Food City and Ingles Markets.

Transportation
Tennessee State Route 36 (North Roan Street) is the main road through Boones Creek and Tennessee State Route 354 (Boones Creek Road) connects Boones Creek with Interstate 26 and US Route 11E and US Route 321 in Jonesborough.

References

Unincorporated communities in Washington County, Tennessee
Johnson City, Tennessee
Unincorporated communities in Tennessee
Neighborhoods in Johnson City, Tennessee